Jenny Jones may refer to:

People
Jenny Jones, Baroness Jones of Moulsecoomb (born 1949), British Green Party politician, member of the House of Lords
Jenny Jones (Labour politician) (born 1948), British Labour politician, former Member of Parliament for Wolverhampton South West
Jenny Jones (presenter) (born 1946), United States television personality and host of The Jenny Jones Show
Jenny Jones (snowboarder) (born 1980), British professional snowboarder

Other
 Jenny Jones (musical), a 1944 West End musical
The Jenny Jones Show, US TV series sometimes referred to as Jenny Jones

See also
Jennifer Jones (disambiguation)
Janie Jones (disambiguation)
Jenna Jones